Rahul Daulatrao Aher is a Member of the Legislative Assembly from Chandwad (Vidhan Sabha constituency) of Maharashtra as a member of Bharatiya Janata Party. On 19 October 2014, he won the assembly election, defeating Indian National Congress candidate by over 11,000 votes.

References

Bharatiya Janata Party politicians from Maharashtra
1973 births
Living people
Maharashtra MLAs 2014–2019